Goyol (decoration or adornment) is an annual fashion event held in Ulaanbaatar, Mongolia. It started in 1988 and the last 21st event took place on 13-15 of December 2008. Foreign designers and models participate in the show since 2000. The grand prix of Goyol-2007 was won by designer of Gobi company B. Nyamsuren, and model G. Tumenjargal was selected as the best model. At the Goyol-2008 event, the designs of 50 designers and 18 companies were featured by 15 male and 55 female models on the catwalk.

Nominations of Goyol-2008 

 Best abstract design – B. Nomungerel
 Best ethnic design – Ts. Enhtuya
 Best daily wear design – O. Bold, Torgo saloon
 Best knitwear design – G. Baasandash, Lats company
 Best leather and fur design – Mönhsaihan & Möngönsor, Monstick company
 Best sewing design – Ts. Uyanga, Shilmel zagvar company
 Best fashion house – Mongoljingoo Institute
 Grand Prix – N. Solyolmaa, Goyo company
 Promising model – O. Purevdulam
 Photo model – J. Bayarmaa
 Second prize – B. Batceceg
 Best female model – M. Garvasuren
 Best male model – M. Bayarjargal
 Best top model – B. Alimaa
 Best top model - B. Dulamsuren

Nominations of Goyol-2009 

Goyol-2009 was organised on the 12-13 December 2008. It featured collections of 50 designers demonstrated by 80 models with more than 500 fashion designs. In addition to the local designers, new collections were also presented by designers from France, the Russian Federation and Korea.

 Top model of the Festival - O. Uyanga
 Grand Prix - Alimaa, Evseg agency
 Best model of the year – E. Selenge
 Best fashion house – Shilmel zagvar agency
 Best male model - D. Samjmyatav
 Second prize - J. Munkhdalai
 Second prize - J. Munkhtsatsaral
 Special prize - S. Ariunbileg
 Photo model - O. Purevdulam

Designers:

 Best ethnic design - D. Unubolor, Shilmel Zagvar agency
 Best daily wear design – Ishdorj, University of Science and Technology
 Best fantasy design - Enkh-Och, City Institute
 Best sewing design – Undraa
 Best knitwear design – Soninjargal, Altai Cashmere LLC
 New material design - Ovdogmid, independent designer
 Special prize - Ganchimeg, City Institute
 Special prize - Ononbayar, Usleg Edlel Zagvar agency
 Special prize - Svetlana Bakyorova, Russian Federation

Nominations of Goyol-2010 

Goyol-2010 took place on the 17-19 December 2009. Sixty models participated in the show
. 

 Top model of the Festival - Ch. Uranbileg

References 

Best top model - B.Dulamsuren

External links 
 http://news.gogo.mn/r/47107
 http://www.news.mn/news/section=news/page=show/content=news/id=31824#0.9359854249091131

Fashion events in Mongolia
Ulaanbaatar
Recurring events established in 1988
Fashion festivals
Festivals in Mongolia
Winter events in Mongolia